Arroz a la cubana (Cuban-style rice) or arroz cubano is a rice dish popular in several Hispanic countries. Its defining ingredients are rice and a fried egg. A plantain or banana, and tomato sauce, are so frequently used as often to be considered defining ingredients. In Catalonia, sausages frequently stand in for the plantains. Its origin is not definitively known; various informal sources state without references that it originated in Peru, the Philippines, etc. Some authors  consider that it may have originated from rice dishes with fried eggs from Cuba when it was a Spanish colony.

There are many minor variations, even within the same regions.

In Spain, a typical dish of arroz a la cubana consists of a serving of white rice with tomato sauce and a fried egg. Sometimes a plantain or banana is fried with the other ingredients.

Arroz a la cubana has been eaten in the Philippines since Spanish colonial times. The modern version always includes ground beef cooked with tomatoes or tomato sauce, and this beef preparation by itself corresponds to picadillo in Latin America. In other words, arroz a la cubana in the Philippines is a combination of picadillo and arroz a la cubana as understood in other countries. It typically consists of ground beef sauteed with onions, garlic, tomato sauce, diced potatoes, raisins, and diced carrots, plus white rice, a fried egg and a ripe native banana, sliced length-wise and fried.

In Peru, it is common for the dish to consist of white rice, fried plantain, a fried hot-dog wiener, and a fried egg over the white rice.

The dish is not popular or known in Cuba itself.

References

Rice dishes
Cuban cuisine
Peruvian cuisine
Spanish words and phrases
Philippine cuisine
Egg dishes
Plantain dishes
Tomato dishes
Spanish rice dishes
Food combinations